Wayne Wilderson (born January 30, 1966) is an American actor who has had guest spots on many successful television programs.

Early life and education 
He was born in Minneapolis, Minnesota. He graduated from Breck School in 1984 and received a Bachelor of Arts in theatre arts from Boston College in 1989.

Career 
Wilderson is also well known as a commercial actor, having appeared in commercials for Popeyes Chicken, MasterCard, Circuit City, Avis, Fruit of the Loom (portraying the purple grape cluster), Reebok, Yahoo! HotJobs, Toyota, Chevy, Washington Mutual, Mitsubishi, Wendy's, Sealy, PlayStation Portable, amongst others.

Wilderson has appeared on episodes of How to Get Away with Murder, Mom, Bones, CSI: Vegas, The Office, Seinfeld, Mr. Show, The Steve Harvey Show, Two and a Half Men, and The Big Bang Theory. He appeared in the pilot episode of The Thick of It as a political blogger. He makes a cameo in Evan Almighty.

Filmography

Film

Television

External links
 
 

1966 births
Living people
African-American male actors
African-American male comedians
American male comedians
21st-century American comedians
American male television actors
Morrissey College of Arts & Sciences alumni
Male actors from Minneapolis
21st-century African-American people
20th-century African-American people